John Marshall Krum (1810–1883) was a lawyer, jurist, and mayor. He was the 11th mayor of St. Louis, Missouri and the first mayor of Alton, Illinois. In 1860, he was the chairman of the Credentials Committee at the Democratic National Convention held in Charleston, South Carolina.

Early life and education
John Marshall Krum was born on March 10, 1810, in Hillsdale, New York to Sarah Trowbridge and Peter Krum. Peter came to America with his father Henry about 1760.

Krum attended Smith Academy at Albany and Fairfield Academy in New York City. In 1829, he attended Union College for one year, but had to quit due to an ailment of his eye. He was a teacher at Kingston, New York and he studied law. In 1833, he was admitted to the bar.

Career
Krum moved to St. Louis in November 1833 and was admitted to the state bar in January 1834. He then moved to Alton, Illinois, practicing law there while also retaining his law office in St. Louis. He was appointed probate judge for Madison County, Illinois, in December 1835. Alton was incorporated in 1837 and he became the town's first mayor during which Elijah Parish Lovejoy was killed by a pro-slavery mob. The following year he became state senator. In 1840, the Krums moved to St. Louis, where he was a successful lawyer, specializing in land cases. He became the Judge of the St. Louis Circuit Court in 1844. In 1848, he resigned from his judicial position and became the first Democrat mayor of St. Louis. 

He was an active participant in creating the public school system as mayor and a member of the Board of Education for ten years. From 1855 until his death, he was the chairman and a member of the Education Committee at Washington University.

In 1860, he was the chairman of the Credentials Committee at the Democratic National Convention held in Charleston, South Carolina. The same year, he canvassed for Stephen A. Douglas in Missouri, Illinois, and New York.

Following the attack on Fort Sumter he left the Democratic Party and became a Republican. He supported the Union during the Civil War. In 1862, he was appointed Colonel of the 9th Military Militia, a local enrolled militia regiment, and remained Colonel until the end of the war.

He was a member, and president for several terms, of the Missouri State Bar Association. He operated his law practice in St. Louis until his death.

Marriage
Krum married Mary Ophelia Harding, daughter of artist Chester Harding in October 1839. They had four children, two of whom were Chester Harding Krum and Margaret Krum, who married Edwin A. DeWitt.

Death
Krum died of pnemonia at his residence in St. Louis on September 15, 1883. He was interred at the Bellefontaine Cemetery in St. Louis.

Notes

References

External links 

1810 births
1883 deaths
Mayors of St. Louis
19th-century American politicians
People from Hillsdale, New York
Missouri Democrats
Mayors of places in Illinois
People from Alton, Illinois
Illinois Democrats
Burials at Bellefontaine Cemetery